Pan Fan (1438 - 1516) was a politician of the Ming dynasty.

Entering service with the imperial examination in 1466, he was appointed as provincial inspector of Sichuan in 1496, and subsequently as Viceroy of Liangguang in 1501.

In his later years, he offended the eunuch Liu Jin and was subsequently exiled to Suzhou (in present-day Gansu).

Ming dynasty politicians
1438 deaths
1516 deaths
Viceroys of Liangguang